Without Compassion is a 1994 Peruvian drama film directed by Francisco José Lombardi, and based on the 1866 novel Crime and Punishment by Fyodor Dostoyevsky. It was screened in the Un Certain Regard section at the 1994 Cannes Film Festival. The film was selected as the Peruvian entry for the Best Foreign Language Film at the 67th Academy Awards, but was not accepted as a nominee.

Cast
 Diego Bertie as Ramón Romano
 Adriana Dávila as Sonia Martinez
 Jorge Chiarella as Mayor Portillo
 Marcello Rivera as Julian Razuri
 Ricardo Fernández as Leandro Martinez
 Carlos Oneto as Priest
 Hernán Romero as Alejandro Velaochaga
 Mariella Trejos as Señora Aliaga
 Humberto Modenesi as Señor Aliaga
 Juan Jose Criados as Nico
 Isabel Solari as Paula
 Mónica Domínguez as Journalist

Awards and nominations
 Havana Film Festival: Best Actor (Diego Berti) (Won)
 Goya Awards :Best Spanish Language Foreign Film (Nominated)

See also
 List of submissions to the 67th Academy Awards for Best Foreign Language Film
 List of Peruvian submissions for the Academy Award for Best Foreign Language Film

References

External links

1994 films
1994 drama films
Peruvian drama films
1990s Peruvian films
1990s Spanish-language films
Films based on Crime and Punishment
Films directed by Francisco José Lombardi